"My Little Angel" is a song written by ex-Easybeats members Harry Vanda and George Young in 1974 and was recorded by Johnny Cabe, aka stage act William Shakespeare. It was Shakespeare's second big hit in Australia and his first number one, making the number-one spot in Australia for three weeks in early 1975.

Reception
Cash Box magazine said "This tune is part rap and part singing, a story to a young girl (a daughter), reassuring her that everybody has a guardian angel. Why? Because she's his. Could pick off some AM pop play if given half a chance."

Charts

Weekly charts

Year-end charts

See also
List of number-one singles in Australia during the 1970s

References

1974 singles
William Shakespeare (singer) songs
Songs written by Harry Vanda
Songs written by George Young (rock musician)
1974 songs
Albert Productions singles